Georges Van Straelen (10 December 1956 – 27 October 2012) was a French footballer and coach.

References

1956 births
2012 deaths
Association football midfielders
French footballers
French football managers
FC Nantes players
FC Girondins de Bordeaux players
Stade Brestois 29 players
Toulouse FC players
RC Strasbourg Alsace players
FC Lorient players
Ligue 1 players
Ligue 2 players